The 1957 Individual Long Track European Championship was the first edition of the Long Track European Championship. The event was held on 15 September 1957 in Stockholm, Sweden.

The  title was won by Basse Hveem of Norway.

Venues
1st semi-final - Plattling , August 4, 1957
2nd semi-final - Vaasa on August 11, 1957
Final - Stockholm , September 15, 1957

Final Classification

References 

Sports competitions in Stockholm
Motor
Motor
1950s in Stockholm
International sports competitions hosted by Sweden